is a geographical region within Niigata Prefecture, Japan.  It includes of the cities of Jōetsu, Itoigawa and Myōkō.

History
The historical Jōetsu region is in the area of the old provinces of Kōzuke and Echigo.  The region is traditionally known as a less developed area of Japan.

The Joetsu area is a strategic hub in the larger regional transport network.

References

External links
 Niigata JET,  Joetsu region

Geography of Niigata Prefecture